YADIFA  (an acronym for Yet Another DNS Implementation For All) is a lightweight authoritative name server, written in C, with DNSSEC capabilities. It was developed by EURid.

See also
 Comparison of DNS server software

References

External links 
 EURid Official Website

DNS software
Free network-related software
DNS server software for Linux